Symphony No. 2 in C major, Op. 140, was composed by Joachim Raff in Weimar in 1866. It is one of the three Raff symphonies that does not carry a descriptive title. It is dedicated to Ernest II, Duke of Saxe-Coburg and Gotha. It was premiered in Weimar in 1867 and was published two years later in Mainz. A few years later the symphony received its second performance in the Leipzig Gewandhaus under Raff's baton. A typical performance lasts for about 37 minutes.

Instrumentation 

The symphony is scored for piccolo, 2 flutes, 2 oboes, 2 clarinets in B-flat, 2 bassoons, 4 horns in F, 2 trumpets in F, trombone, bass trombone, timpani and strings.

Structure 

The symphony is structured in four movements:

 Allegro
 Andante con moto
 Allegro vivace
 Andante maestoso. Allegro con spirito

External links 
 Detailed description at raff.org
  (Symphony page on imslp.org)
  Raff Orchestral Works Vol 1 /  by Jarvi Neeme recording and review, readings.com.au

1866 compositions
Symphonies by Joachim Raff
Compositions in C major